The 1967 LPGA Championship was the thirteenth LPGA Championship, held July 13–16 at Pleasant Valley Country Club in Sutton, Massachusetts, southeast of Worcester.

Kathy Whitworth sank a  birdie putt on the final hole to win the first of her three LPGA Championships, one stroke ahead of runner-up Shirley Englehorn; the two were in the final pairing as 54-hole co-leaders at 215 (−4). With three holes to play, Whitworth led by two strokes, but an Englehorn birdie on 16 and a Whitworth bogey on 17 left them tied on the final tee. Defending champion Gloria Ehret finished thirteen strokes back, tied for tenth. It was the third of Whitworth's six major titles.

This was the first of seven LPGA Championships held at Pleasant Valley in an eight-year stretch.

Past champions in the field

Source:

Final leaderboard
Sunday, July 16, 1967

Source:

References

External links
Golf Stats leaderboard
Pleasant Valley Country Club

LPGA Championship
LPGA Championship
LPGA Championship
Golf in Massachusetts
History of Worcester County, Massachusetts
LPGA Championship
Sports competitions in Massachusetts
Sports in Worcester County, Massachusetts
Sutton, Massachusetts
Tourist attractions in Worcester County, Massachusetts
Women's PGA Championship
Women's sports in Massachusetts